Jan Thopas (1627–1695), was a Dutch Golden Age painter.	
	
He was born in Arnhem and later moved to Assendelft via Amsterdam.	
He is known for portraits and miniatures, and died in Assendelft between 1685 and 1695.

References	
	

Jan Thopas on Artnet	
	
	
	
	
	
1627 births	
1695 deaths	
Dutch Golden Age painters
Dutch male painters	
People from Arnhem